Lose Control was an Indian television programming block, which aired over four hours daily on Disney Channel India.

The program features a competition in which viewers must guess which series a featured clip is from. Weekly winners are awarded a Disney-branded scooter, and have the chance to win a trip to Hong Kong Disneyland.

Shows
Recess
Akkad Bakkad Bambey Bo
Art Attack
Dhoom Machaao Dhoom
Hanuman
Hannah Montana
Vicky & Vetaal

References

Television programming blocks in Asia
Disney Channel (Indian TV channel) original programming